Larissa Muldoon (born 11 March 1991), from Ballybofey, Co Donegal, is a rugby union player for Railway Union, Ulster rugby  and the Irish Rugby Football Union.

Her first sport was ladies gaelic football which she played for Donegal at Under-14 and Under-16 level. 

She made her debut for the Ireland women's rugby union team at the age of 19, just two years after taking up the sport.

She played for Ulster's U18s and seniors first and her selection for Ireland was prompted by the Cardiff Metropolitan University who sent a video of her in action to the Irish Rugby Football Union.

Muldoon was a member of the Ireland team that won its first ever Six Nations and Grand Slam in 2013 and also a member when they won the 2015 Women's Six Nations.

She  also represented  at the 2014 Women's Rugby World Cup held in France where they had a historic victory over New Zealand's Black Ferns and finished fourth.

She played for Ireland at the 2017 Women's Rugby World Cup.

In 2021 she was selected at scrum-half in the Irish women's Team of the Decade by the Front Row Union website. She has amassed 48 caps for the Ireland women's rugby union team but was unavailable for selection in 2021 due to injury.

Muldoon obtained a Masters in Sports Management and Leadership from Cardiff Metropolitan University. She is a qualified teacher and coach. She worked as a Gaelic Games Development Officer for Dublin GAA  in 2017 but, since late 2018, has worked fulltime as a Development Officer for Leinster Rugby, specialising in promoting the game for girls and women.

References

External links
Irish Rugby Profile

1991 births
Living people
Irish female rugby union players
Ireland women's international rugby union players
Irish expatriate sportspeople in England
Irish schoolteachers
Rugby union players from County Donegal
Ireland international women's rugby sevens players
Irish Exiles women's rugby union players
Railway Union rugby union players